is a Japanese surname. Notable people with the surname include:

, Japanese painter
, Japanese luger
, Japanese football goalkeeper
, Japanese golfer
, Japanese diplomat

See also
Kanayama Castle, a castle in Gunma Prefecture, Japan
Kanayama Station (disambiguation), multiple train stations in Japan
Kanayama Dam, a dam in Hokkaidō, Japan
Kaneyama (disambiguation), another toponym written with the same characters

Japanese-language surnames